This is a list of trip hop artists, a genre that originated in Bristol, England.

0–9

12 Rounds
8mm
9 Lazy 9

A

Aim
Air
Dot Allison
Alpha
Archive
Attica Blues

B

Howie B
Baby Fox
The Baby Namboos
BANKS
Beast
Bitter:Sweet
Björk
Blue Foundation
Blue States
Bomb the Bass
Bonobo
Bowery Electric

C

Céu
Neneh Cherry
Chinese Man
Cibo Matto
CirKus
Coldcut
Creep

D

Delilah
Depth Charge
Dido
The Dining Rooms
DJ Cam
DJ Food
DJ Krush
DJ Shadow
DJ Spooky
DJ Vadim

E

Earthling
Earthphish
Elsiane
Emancipator
Esthero
Everything but the Girl

F

Faithless
Fink
FKA twigs
Fluke
Flunk
Funki Porcini

G

Glass Animals
Goldfrapp
Gorillaz
Groove Armada

H

Zeid Hamdan
The Herbaliser
Hooverphonic
How to Destroy Angels
Hungry Lucy
Hypnogaja

I

Ilya
The Internet

J

Jay-Jay Johanson
Juryman

K

Kid Loco
Kosheen
Kruder & Dorfmeister

L

Lamb
Tim "Love" Lee
Little Dragon
London Grammar
Lovage
Lunascape

M

Martina Topley-Bird
Mandalay
Massive Attack
Metaphra
Moko
Moloko
Monk & Canatella
Mono
Morcheeba
Mr. Scruff

N

Nicolette
Nightmares on Wax
Noonday Underground

O

Olive
Beth Orton

P

Poliça
Portishead
Pretty Lights

R

Rae & Christian
Recloose
Red Snapper
LiLi Roquelin

S

Danny Saber
Shantel
Sia
Skylab
Smith & Mighty
Smoke City
Sneaker Pimps
Soap Kills
Sofa Surfers
Mark Stewart
Supreme Beings of Leisure

T

Team Sleep
Terranova
Thievery Corporation
Tracey Thorn
Tosca
Tranquility Bass
Tricky

U
Unkle

W

Wagon Christ
Wax Poetic
Wax Tailor
Charles Webster
The Wiseguys

Y
Yasmin

Z
Zero 7

References

Bibliography

Trip hop